An election of the delegation from Finland to the European Parliament took place on 26 May 2019.

A working committee consisting of the party secretaries of all parliamentary parties suggested in May 2017 that the 2019 Finnish parliamentary election, scheduled for April, should be organized simultaneously with the European Parliament election. The suggestion was considered by the Minister of Justice Antti Häkkänen, but did not have enough parliamentary support to pass. Ultimately, the Finnish parliamentary election took place on 14 April 2019.

Opinion polls

Results

References

European Parliament elections in Finland
Finland
European